The Roman Catholic Diocese of Concordia (erected 10 April 1961) is in Argentina and is a suffragan of the Archdiocese of Paraná.

Ordinaries
Ricardo Rösch (1961–1976)
Adolfo Gerstner (1977–1998)
Héctor Sabatino Cardelli (1998–2004), appointed Bishop of San Nicolás de los Arroyos
Luis Armando Collazuol (2004– )

External links and references
 

Concordia
Concordia
Concordia
Concordia
1961 establishments in Argentina
Concordia, Entre Ríos